Ainon Phancha (Thai : อินทร์อร พันธุ์ชา, born 26 January 1992) is a Thai international footballer who plays as a midfielder.

International goals

References

External links 
 
 

1992 births
Living people
Women's association football midfielders
Ainon Phancha
Ainon Phancha
Ainon Phancha
Ainon Phancha
Southeast Asian Games medalists in football
Footballers at the 2018 Asian Games
Competitors at the 2013 Southeast Asian Games
Competitors at the 2017 Southeast Asian Games
2019 FIFA Women's World Cup players
Ainon Phancha
Competitors at the 2019 Southeast Asian Games
2015 FIFA Women's World Cup players
Ainon Phancha